Lazy Raiders (originally Dig It Up) is a video game developed by Sarbakan and published by Microsoft Game Studios on Xbox Live Arcade. It was available for download on February 24, 2010.

Gameplay
Lazy Raiders uses a "World-Flip" mechanic that allows the player to flip and spin the entire world, which allows gravity to move objects (such as Dr. Diggabone, boulders, minions and thieves) through mazes. The game has 80 levels set in three different settings: Seven Cities of Gold, Arctic Caves and Wild West. There are 12 XBLA Achievements to collect.

Development
Lazy Raiders was originally planned for both an XBLA and a WiiWare release, but the developers struggled to reach both demographics. Eventually they abandoned WiiWare as the multiplatform angle "resulted in design hazards that did nothing but dilute the whole game experience." Likewise, the game was initially planned to include two multiplayer modes. These were scrapped as the team was already under heavy time constraints. On June 7, 2016, it was announced that Lazy Raiders along with Anomaly: Warzone Earth and Aqua will be released for Xbox One Back Compat.

Reception

IGN gave the game an 8/10, describing it as "one of the most polished and good looking XBLA games we've played in a while." Pocket Gamer gave it 8/10 and called it "A priceless artifact".

References

External links
Official website and trailer
Sarbakan

2010 video games
Puzzle video games
Cancelled Wii games
Video games developed in Canada
Xbox 360 Live Arcade games
Xbox 360-only games
Xbox 360 games
Single-player video games